Manfred H. Lachs (April 21, 1914 in Stanislav, Austrian Galicia – January 14, 1993 in The Hague) was a Polish diplomat, Judge of the International Court of Justice, and jurist who greatly influenced the development of international law after World War II.

Life
Lachs was born to a Jewish family. Lachs attended the Krakow Jagiellonian University where he earned a doctorate in Laws (1937). Right after his studies, he started working for the Consular Academy of Vienna and afterwards in the London School of Economics. Lachs was drafted in the army and throughout his military service he was advisor to the Polish government.

During the Second World War, Lachs escaped to London, and served as secretary to Ignacy Schwarzbart, who was one of the two Jewish representatives on the National Council of the Polish government-in-exile. Lachs' family, which remained in Poland, were murdered in the Holocaust. Lachs was devoted towards ensuring the prosecution of the perpetrators of the Holocaust and of crimes in Poland.

Before his career turned toward international law, he filled many judiciary posts in the Polish government such as Poland's Foreign Affairs director of the Department of treaties and legal jurisdiction (1947–1960) and prime minister's special advisor (1960–1967). He was the first Chair of the Legal Subcommittee of the UN Committee for the Peaceful Uses of Outer Space (1959-1967). During the Paris' Peace conference of 1946, Lachs stood for his country as a delegate. He later became a professor of international law at the University of Warsaw (1952–1993), and served as a member of the Polish delegation of the general assembly of the United Nations. It is said that Lachs' legal brilliance is what insulated him from anti-Semitic purges in Poland.

Afterwards, Lachs became a judge on the International Court of Justice, and eventually became one of the longest-serving judges there, working from 1967 until 1993, and presiding it from 1973 to 1976. He wrote The Law of Outer Space: An Experience in Contemporary Law Making in 1972, and the Teacher in International Law is 1982.

The International Institute of Social Studies (ISS) awarded its Honorary Fellowship 1982. Member Honoris Causa of The Mexican Academy of International Law.

Manfred Lachs Moot Court Competition
After his death, the Manfred Lachs Space Law Moot Competition was named in his honour by the International Institute of Space Law.

References

 
 
 Profile at The International Institute of Social Studies (ISS)

External links
 
 
 

1914 births
1993 deaths
Jews from Galicia (Eastern Europe)
Polish diplomats
Alumni of the London School of Economics
International law scholars
International Law Commission officials
Diplomats from Ivano-Frankivsk
Presidents of the International Court of Justice
20th-century Polish judges
Polish judges of United Nations courts and tribunals
Polish Jews
Members of the International Law Commission